Fields Of Omagh (foaled 1997) is a champion middle distance Australian  Thoroughbred racehorse of the early-mid-2000s. He was a half-brother to the stakeswinners, King Brian (Bunbury Cup, Pinjarra Cup), Malcolm (STC Canterbury Stakes, Ajax Stakes and Yallambee Stud Stakes) and Timeless Grace (VATC WW Cockram Stakes).

Fields Of Omagh was trained at Lindsay Park, South Australia by Peter Hayes, Tony McEvoy and David Hayes. 'FOO', as he was affectionately dubbed by fans and the media, won seven races in succession in the early part of his career. Nursed back from two serious injuries by Dr. Campbell Baker, head veterinary surgeon for Lindsay Park, the horse gained a reputation as a Moonee Valley specialist. He is also noted for his gallant runners-up behind Northerly in the 2002 Caulfield Cup. He won the Valley's prestigious Cox Plate for the first time in 2003, and, in a record-equalling fifth attempt, created history in becoming the race's oldest winner, as a nine-year-old, in 2006. In between these wins, he was second to Savabeel, and third behind Makybe Diva. 'FOO' also won the 2006 Group One Futurity Stakes. 'FOO' campaigned at or near the highest level for six years in-a-row and raced against a number of champions including Makybe Diva, Sunline, Northerly, Lonhro and El Segundo.

During his racing career he travelled to Japan, Hong Kong and the United Arab Emirates.

Fields Of Omagh retired after his second Cox Plate win, and now resides at Living Legends, the International Home of Rest for Champion Horses located in Woodlands Historic Park, Greenvale, Victoria, Australia.

A book on the life of Fields Of Omagh and his 18 owners was published in September 2007.

Race record

Pedigree

See also
 List of millionaire racehorses in Australia

References

Fields of Omagh website
Fields of Omagh at the park's opening

External links
Fields Of Omagh's pedigree and partial racing stats
Fields of Omagh profile of a champion

1997 racehorse births
Thoroughbred family 6-e
Racehorses bred in Australia
Racehorses trained in Australia
Cox Plate winners